The diminutive serotine (Eptesicus diminutus) is a bat species found in Argentina, Colombia, Brazil, Paraguay, Uruguay, and Venezuela.

References

Eptesicus
Bats of South America
Bats of Brazil
Mammals of Argentina
Mammals of Colombia
Mammals of Paraguay
Mammals of Uruguay
Mammals of Venezuela
Mammals described in 1915
Taxa named by Wilfred Hudson Osgood